Li Jingjing (born February 1, 1985 in Changle, Fujian) is a Chinese slalom canoeist who competed at the international level from 2002 to 2013. At the 2004 Summer Olympics in Athens, she was eliminated in the qualifying round of the K1 event, finishing in 18th place. Four years later in Beijing, Li was eliminated in the semifinals of the same event. She was classified in 13th place. At the 2012 Summer Olympics in London she was once again eliminated in the semifinal of the K1 event, finishing in 11th place.

World Cup individual podiums

1 Asia Canoe Slalom Championship counting for World Cup points
2 Oceania Championship counting for World Cup points

References

1985 births
Living people
Sportspeople from Fuzhou
Sportspeople from Fujian
Olympic canoeists of China
Canoeists at the 2004 Summer Olympics
Canoeists at the 2008 Summer Olympics
Canoeists at the 2012 Summer Olympics
Asian Games medalists in canoeing
Canoeists at the 2010 Asian Games
Chinese female canoeists
Medalists at the 2010 Asian Games
Asian Games silver medalists for China
21st-century Chinese women